Keith John Pitt (born 31 August 1969) is an Australian politician. He is a member of the National Party and has represented the Division of Hinkler in Queensland since the 2013 federal election. He was a member of cabinet in the Morrison Government as Minister for Resources and Water and also served as an assistant minister in the Turnbull Government. He was an electrical engineer and businessman before entering politics.

Early life
Pitt was born in Bundaberg, Queensland. He grew up in Woongarra and attended Kepnock State High School before taking up an electrical apprenticeship. He went on to the Queensland University of Technology, graduating with the degree of Bachelor of Engineering.

Pitt worked as an electrical fitter mechanic before joining Bundaberg Sugar as an electrical engineer. He later served as the company's group safety co-ordinator. In 2002, he established the Australian Safety and Training Alliance, a workplace health and safety training provider. He and his wife also purchased two sugarcane farms, one bought in 1998 and one in 2004, but they were sold to concentrate on the training business.

Parliamentary career
In December 2012, Pitt won the Liberal National Party of Queensland's preselection ballot for the Division of Hinkler, following the retirement of incumbent MP Paul Neville. He had been a member of the LNP for only six months prior to his selection, and stated that his victory in the ballot was a surprise. He retained Hinkler for the party at the 2013 federal election and like Neville sits with the Nationals in federal parliament. He was re-elected at the 2016 and 2019 federal elections.

Pitt served as the Assistant Minister to the Deputy Prime Minister between February and July 2016, following a rearrangement in the First Turnbull Ministry. With the reelection of the Turnbull Government in 2016, Pitt served as the Assistant Minister for Trade, Investment and Tourism between July 2016 and December 2017 in the Second Turnbull Ministry. He returned as Assistant Minister to the Deputy Prime Minister from 5 March to 28 August 2018.

In February 2020, following the resignation of Matt Canavan, Pitt was reappointed to the ministry as Minister for Resources, Water and Northern Australia in the Second Morrison Ministry. He reportedly supported Michael McCormack against Barnaby Joyce in the preceding Nationals leadership spill. He contested the party's vacant deputy leadership against David Littleproud and David Gillespie, with Littleproud emerging victorious.

Political views
In December 2017, Pitt was one of only four members of the House of Representatives to vote against the Marriage Amendment (Definition and Religious Freedoms) Act 2017, which legalised same-sex marriage in Australia.

Described as "one of the government’s most outspoken advocates for nuclear power", Pitt quit as assistant minister in August 2018 to demonstrate his opposition to the government commitment to the Paris Agreement on emission reductions. He has been described as "one of the key drivers" behind a 2019 parliamentary inquiry into nuclear power which "recommended the government consider adding the energy technology to its future energy mix".

In a May 2021 interview with Sky News Australia presenter, Tom Connell, Pitt declined to admit that batteries could provide dispatchable power to back up electricity generated by a wind farm.

Personal life
Pitt has three children with his wife Allison.

Notes

References

|-

|-

|-

|-

1969 births
Australian farmers
Government ministers of Australia
Liberal National Party of Queensland members of the Parliament of Australia
Living people
Members of the Australian House of Representatives
Members of the Australian House of Representatives for Hinkler
People from Bundaberg
Queensland University of Technology alumni
Turnbull Government
21st-century Australian politicians
Australian electrical engineers
Morrison Government